Intercostal means "between the ribs". It can refer to:

 Intercostal muscle
 Highest intercostal vein
 Intercostal arteries
 Intercostal space